Cameron Skelton (born 8 March 1995 in Auckland, New Zealand), is a professional rugby union player who plays for Counties Manukau.

He is the brother of Australian international second-row Will Skelton and represented the Samoa national under-20 team at the 2014 Junior World Rugby Championship. Born in New Zealand, he moved with his family to Australia at the age of 7. He is noted for his immense size, and at 207 cm (6 ft 9 ½ in) in height, and 153 kg (24 st 2 lb, 338 lb) in weight, he is both taller and heavier than older brother Will. He wears a size 17 (UK) boot. He is eligible to play for Australia, New Zealand or Samoa.

He was signed by the Waikato Chiefs in the Summer of 2014.

References

Australian rugby union players
Rugby union locks
Australian sportspeople of Samoan descent
Australian people of New Zealand descent
New Zealand emigrants to Australia
1995 births
Living people
Counties Manukau rugby union players
Rugby union players from Auckland